Song 1 may refer to:

 Song of Songs 1, the first chapter in the biblical book "Song of Songs" or "Song of Solomon"
 Song Number 1, a song by Russian girl group Serebro